Tricolore, the French and Italian spelling of tricolour, may refer to:

 The flag of France
 The flag of Italy
 Tricolore (ballet), a 1978 ballet by Peter Martins, Jean-Pierre Bonnefoux and Jerome Robbins
 Tricolore (album), a 2013 album by Derbyshire indie band Haiku Salut
 Adidas Tricolore, the official football of the 1998 World Cup
 Le Tricolore de Montréal, a soccer team
 Montreal Canadiens, a Canadian hockey team, nicknamed Le Tricolore

See also
 Tricolor (disambiguation)